The Regulator of Social Housing regulates registered providers of social housing in England.  This function was transferred from the Homes and Communities Agency in October 2018. Until April 2012 it was performed by the Tenant Services Authority. It is sponsored by the Department for Levelling Up, Housing and Communities.

It maintains a list of registered social housing providers.

It has challenged the business model of some providers where rent income from housing benefit payments is less than lease expenditure.

In November 2022 it reduced the financial viability grading for 19 housing associations, because of higher inflation and borrowing costs, and a weakening housing market.

See also
Scottish Housing Regulator

References

External links
 

2011 establishments in England
Housing in England
Housing
Executive agencies of the United Kingdom government
Public housing in England
Social programs